Kunturiri (Aymara kunturi condor, -(i)ri a suffix, Hispanicized spelling Condoriri) is a mountain in the Cordillera Real in the Bolivian Andes, about  high. It is situated in the La Paz Department, Murillo Province, La Paz Municipality. Ch'iyar Quta Jawira ("black lake river", Chiar Khota Jahuira) flows along its southern slopes. Kunturiri lies southeast of the mountain Kunturiri of the Los Andes Province and southwest of the mountains Llust'a and Ch'alla Willk'i.

References 

Mountains of La Paz Department (Bolivia)
Climbing areas of Bolivia